Cambarus carinirostris, the rock crayfish, is a species of crayfish in the family Cambaridae. It is found in the mid-Atlantic region of the United States.

Taxonomy

Cambarus carinirostris was long considered a subspecies of C. bartonii until its elevation to species level in 1995.

Description

Cambarus carinirostris is moderate sized, with a mean total carapace length of  reported. Dorsally, it is brown or beige, with crimson borders on the abdominal terga. while the ventral surfaces and pereiopods are cream or white in color. The chelae are olive or brown, with cream or yellow propodal tubercles.

Habitat and distribution
Cambarus carinirostris is native to the Monongahela, Ohio, and Allegheny River systems, and can be found from New York to eastern Ohio and central West Virginia. Within this range, it primarily inhabits headwater streams, where it occupies open spaces under benthic debris such as boulders. The rock crayfish is also a prolific secondary burrower, commonly constructing shallow burrows in the soft substrate on the banks of streams.

References

Cambaridae
Crustaceans described in 1914
Taxa named by Walter Faxon